The Riyadh Metro is a rapid transit system under construction in Riyadh, the capital city of Saudi Arabia. It is part of the King Abdulaziz Project for Riyadh Public Transport and will consist of six metro lines spanning a total length of 176 kilometers, with 85 stations. The project will cost $22.5 billion to build. It is expected to open to passengers in 2023.

This will be the second metro system in Saudi Arabia, after the Al Mashaaer Al Mugaddassah Metro line, which opened in November 2010, fourth on the Arabian Peninsula, sixth in the Arab World, and fifteenth in the Middle East.

History 
Estimates suggest that Riyadh's population will grow from about 6 million to more than 8.5 million over the next 10 years. In June 2013, a shortlist of three major global consortia was chosen to build the metro. Contracts were awarded in July 2013, with construction planned to start in 2014 and take 4 years. The groundbreaking ceremony was celebrated on April 4, 2014. It is currently being built by construction companies including Bechtel, Almabani General Contractors, Consolidated Contractors Company, Strukton, Webuild, Larsen & Toubro, Samsung and Nesma.

Consortia 

BACS: Bechtel / Almabani / CCC / Siemens

ANM: (Arriyadh New Mobility): Webuild (at the time of signature, Impregilo, then Salini-Impregilo) / Bombardier / Ansaldo / Larsen & Toubro / WorleyParsons

FAST: FCC / Strukton / Atkins / Alstom / Samsung / Tecnica Y Proyectos

The new project is expected to be the centerpiece of the city's public transport system, integrated with an  three-line bus rapid transit (BRT) network. The project will contribute to reducing the number of car trips by nearly 250 thousand trips a day, equivalent to 400 thousand liters of fuel per day, thus reducing the air pollutant emissions in the city. It is expected that the capacity of the project will reach 3.6 million passengers a day.

In February 2018, Riyadh governor, Prince Faisal bin Bandar, stated that 68% of the project has been finished and that the metro will go Demo Run in late September 2018. In March 2018, the Saudi economy minister Mohammad Al Tuwaijri commented at the Saudi-UK CIO Forum in London that a soft opening is planned for 2019 (June–August) and the full availability of the system is expected in 2021. In December 2021, it was announced that more than 90% of the project had been completed, with testing well underway. In 2022, Riyadh Metro was delayed to 2023 for unknown reasons. In 2023, Riyadh metro announced to open in April 2023.

Stations 
The transit system is planned to have 85 train stations, including a number of interchange stations. Naming rights for 15 out of the 85 stations are planned to be awarded by the Arriyadh Development Authority (ADA). These rights include space for shops and advertising within the stations.

The vehicles and stations are monitored by cameras, early warning systems, and communication systems that are directly connected to the main control centre. The main stations are characterized by monorail sites designed in several levels. These sites will be air-conditioned taking into account the comfort and safety of passengers. The stations will also use solar cells technology to save about 20% of the power required for air-conditioning and lightning.

STC Station 
Olaya metro station is one of the three main transportation stations in the Riyadh Metro. Gerber Architekten won the competition for the metro station in 2012. Construction started in 2014 and planned to be completed in 2019. This station will allow access for Line 1 and Line 2 trains. The gross floor area (GFA) is about 97,000 m2. It is located on the intersection of King Abdullah Road with King Fahad Road and Olaya Street. Its design proposes the idea of Public gardens that extend over the entire area of the station. Metro customers are invited to use the public gardens. The gardens are characterized by palm trees erected on top of the station, designated picnic areas, and WiFi coverage. Stairs, lifts, and escalators connect all the levels allowing access to everyone including people with special needs. There is also a public parking located underneath the plaza. Recently the initial plan has been changed and no longer features gardens of the roof and is now rectangular in shape though it still has all the other features. In 2018 the station was named STC station.

Western Metro Station 
The station covers an area of 12,500 m2. The station is located on the land currently used for the Central Vegetable Market of Al-Suwaidi Al-Gharbi. The station will be composed of a bus route and a link to Line 3. Omrania & Associates has won the competition to design the western metro station.

King Abdullah Financial District (KAFD) Metro Station 
The station covers an area of 8.150 m2. The station is located at the east of the Northern Ring Road. It connects metro lines 1, 4, 6, and the KAFD's monorail. The station is designed by Zaha Hadid Architects from the UK.

Qasr Al-Hukm Metro Station 
This station covers an area of 19,600 m2 and will connect Line 1 and Line 3 trains. Snøhetta from Norway had won the competition to design the Qasr Al-Hukm Metro Station.

Network 
The Metro Project include the following six lines, also shown in figure 1:

The project was originally led by the late Prince Sattam bin Abdulaziz Al Saud, former governor of Riyadh and chairman of the Arriyadh Development Authority, and is now led by Turki bin Abdullah Al Saud, the current governor of Riyadh.

Infrastructure

Rolling stock 
 Siemens is supplying 45 4-car Inspiro trainsets for Line 1 and 29 2-car sets for Line 2. The first was unveiled in Vienna on 23 February 2016.
 Bombardier will deliver 47 two-car Innovia Metro 300 trainsets for Line 3.
 Alstom will deliver 69 Metropolis train sets for line 4, 5 and 6 of the Riyadh Metro. The first trainset was handed over to the ADA in March 2017. Each trainset is 36 meters long and can accommodate a maximum of 231 passengers. Trains are split into three classes – first, family, and single class – separated by glass partitions.

Operating Control Center 
The project includes the construction of an advanced center for the control and operation of the train traffic management to monitor all elements of the system including stations, tracks, facilities, and systems.

The Monorail project will notably use the technology of an automated rail system (without driver). It will also allow the separation of the vehicles from the inside, and the allocation of special cars for families, in addition to providing them with communication services and the exchange of information for passengers.

Corruption allegations 
In 2017, prince Turki bin Abdullah Al Saud was arrested as part of the 2017 Saudi Arabian purge. Part of the allegations against him, was that he, as Riyadh Governor, had awarded contracts for the Riyadh Metro to his own companies.

See also 
 Transport in Saudi Arabia
 Jeddah Metro
 Madinah Metro
 Makkah Metro
 Haramain High Speed Rail Project

References

External links 

 Official Website of High Commission for the Development of Arriyadh
 Lines 1 and 2 website

2021 establishments in Saudi Arabia
Metro
Rapid transit in Saudi Arabia
Proposed rail infrastructure in Saudi Arabia
Proposed public transport in Asia
Rapid transit systems under construction